The Broad Progressive Front (FAP) was a centre-left coalition in Argentina, created in 2011, integrated of progressive and social democratic political parties focusing on an advanced and transparent welfare state. In 2013, it was replaced by UNEN, which in turn was replaced by the Progresistas in 2015.

History

Creation 
The FAP emerged on Saturday June 11, 2011, after the V Extraordinary National Congress of the Socialist Party. Until that moment, the PS had not yet defined its policy of alliances at the national level, having tried to achieve a Progressive Front that would integrate the center-left forces at the national level since the end of 2009.

The tension in which the PS found itself had two fronts: on the one hand, its relationship with the UCR, with which it formed the Progressive, Civic and Social Front in Santa Fe (a coalition that had led Binner to govern the province). and on the other hand, different center-left forces headed by the South Project Movement, which wanted to move away from the Argentine bipartisanship towards a third alternative position. This tension increases with the running of 2011, as both sides pressured the PS for a definition.

2011 general elections 
The primary elections of August 14, 2011 were the electoral debut of the Frente Amplio Progresista with the presidential candidacy of Hermes Binner. Just a few weeks after its founding, this Front reached 2,125,000 votes throughout the country, that is, around 10.30% of the votes, ranking fourth and only 1.9% behind second.

However, the high positive image of Hermes Binner - and the progressive increase in his knowledge - are indicators that his electorate can continue to grow, consolidating itself as the main force of the opposition.

In the presidential elections, on October 23, he obtained second place with about 17% of the votes, surpassing the radical Ricardo Alfonsín who obtained 11%, totaling 3,700,000 votes throughout the country, thus becoming the main force opponent of the Front for Victory.

Dissolution 
The front ceased to exist in 2013, when some of its members, together with the Radical Civic Union and the Civic Coalition ARI, formed the Broad Front UNEN. After the failure of this project, the parties that had formed the FAP regrouped under the Progresistas coalition.

Members 
The Broad Progressive Front was composed of:

Proposals 
Some of the main proposals of the Broad Progressive Front are:
 Parliamentary system.
 Gender identity law.
 Assisted reproduction law.
 Same-sex marriage law.
 End of gay blood donation ban.
 Gender equality and eradication of femicide.
 Drug liberalization.
 Sex education.
 Universal and free reproductive health access.
 Complete nationalization of YPF.
 Special policies for the reduction of maternal death.
 Recognition of the Argentine Workers' Central Union (CTA).
 Institutional development of the Union of South American Nations.
 Participatory budgeting.
 Analysis of the external debt.
 Revision of subsidies.

See also 
 Progressive, Civic and Social Front
 Hermes Binner
 Margarita Stolbizer
 Roy Cortina
 Victoria Donda
 Luis Juez
 Norma Morandini
 Rubén Giustiniani

References

External links
 Website of Hermes Binner's presidential campaign

2011 establishments in Argentina
2013 disestablishments in Argentina
Defunct left-wing political party alliances
Defunct political party alliances in Argentina
Defunct social democratic parties
Democratic socialist parties in South America
Political parties disestablished in 2013
Political parties established in 2011
Political party factions in Argentina
Progressive parties
Social democratic parties in Argentina